Remsen may refer to:

Places in the United States
Remsen, Iowa, a community in Plymouth County
Remsen, New York, a town in Oneida County
Remsen (village), New York, a village located within the town of Remsen
Remsen, New Jersey, a town located in Woodbridge township

People with the surname
Bert Remsen (1925–1999), American actor
Ira Remsen, the discoverer of saccharin

See also
Remsen Stakes, an American Thoroughbred horse race